The Church of Our Most Holy Redeemer and St Thomas More, also referred to as Holy Redeemer Church, is a Roman Catholic Parish church in Chelsea, London. it was built in the 19th century and opened on 23 October 1895. It was designed by Edward Goldie. It is situated on the corner of Upper Cheyne Row and Cheyne Row, next to Carlyle's House in the Royal Borough of Kensington and Chelsea. It is listed Grade II on the National Heritage List for England.

History

Construction
In the early 1890s, Cardinal Herbert Vaughan requested Canon Cornelius James Keens to go to Chelsea and create a mission to serve the local Catholic population. In 1892 Canon Keens obtained permission from the Archdiocese of Westminster to build a church in the area. Originally, it was to be called the Church of the Most Holy Redeemer. The foundation stone was laid on 7 June 1894 and the church was opened on 23 October 1895. The church was consecrated on 21 June 1905 by Cardinal Francis Bourne.

Renamed
The dedication of the church was changed in 1935 after Thomas More was canonised. It became the Church of the Most Holy Redeemer and St Thomas More.

Repair and renovation
In September 1940, during the Second World War, the church was damaged by a bomb which killed nineteen people. The west wall and organ were destroyed. After the war, the church was repaired.

In 1962, the restoration work was undertaken in the church. From 1970 to 1972, the church was reordered. The floor of the chancel was relaid, so that the altar could be brought towards the congregation and a marble ambo was installed. In 1980 a new font was also installed to match the ambo.

Weddings
Sean and Eileen O'Casey on 23 September 1927
David Bruce Huxley and Anna Remsen Schenk on 27 June 1939
Anna del Conte and Oliver Waley on 5 October 1950
Bernard and Gillian Cribbins on 27 August 1955
Hugh James Arbuthnott to Vanessa Dyer in 1964

Parish
The church has five Sunday Masses, at 6:30pm on Saturday, 10:00am and 11:00am on Sunday and 12:15pm and 6:30pm on Sunday. It also has weekday Masses at 8:00am from Monday to Friday.

Exterior

See also
 Allen Hall Seminary
 Redemptoris Mater House of Formation

References

External links

19th-century Roman Catholic church buildings in the United Kingdom
Our Most Holy Redeemer
Churches bombed by the Luftwaffe in London
Edward Goldie church buildings
Our Most Holy Redeemer
Grade II listed Roman Catholic churches in England
Renaissance Revival architecture in the United Kingdom
Churches in the Roman Catholic Diocese of Westminster
Roman Catholic churches completed in 1895
Our Most Holy Redeemer